Artesian Well Park is a small urban park in downtown Salt Lake City that contains a natural artesian spring fed by an underground aquifer. It occupies a quarter acre on the southwest corner of the intersection between 800 South and 500 East. People from all over the surrounding area have been coming to get water for free from this spring for over 100 years.

History 
Historical records show that the spring has been in use going back at least to pioneer times when men watered their oxen hauling granite to the Latter Day Saint temple site in Salt Lake City from the quarry in Little Cottonwood Canyon. In 1936 Salt Lake City filed a water claim for a flow of 2-20 gallons per minute and listed the priority date as 1890. The site of the spring was turned into its current form as Artesian Well Park in 1979 when Salt Lake City invested $79,450 to add sidewalks and benches and to reconfigure the spring to flow out of spigots in a brick casing. The well casing and plumbing were upgraded four years later. In 2020, Salt Lake City made further upgrades to the park, including rebuilding the water spigots to accommodate larger water containers.

Water quality and safety 
To ensure the water flowing from the spring is potable, Salt Lake City tests it weekly for coliform bacteria and monthly for perchlorate. Tests for metals and chemical contaminants like pesticides and herbicides are performed annually. Good4Utah had water from the spring independently tested, and found that the water did not contain pesticides, chlorine, fluoride, bacteria, arsenic, or lead. The Good4Utah test also showed that the water was relatively hard, containing a lot of calcium, magnesium, and iron. In 2007, the artesian spring water did test positive for perchlorate at a level of 4.6 parts per billion (ppb), which was below the EPA's guideline of 24.5 ppb. The safe level for perchlorate in drinking water is debated, with some states setting it at 200 ppb and others setting it at 1 ppb. For 2015-2016, Salt Lake City reported a perchlorate level in the water of 2-4 ppb.

Water source 
The spring is fed by an aquifer that extends all the way up underneath the University of Utah, and may be fed in part by Red Butte Creek. Percolation to the spring is quite slow, with water from as close as five blocks away taking three years to arrive at the spring. The nearby Tracy Aviary in Liberty Park also contains natural springs.

See also 
 Liberty Park, another park in Salt Lake City with artesian well water
 Artesian Commons, a park in Olympia, Washington built in 2014 around an artesian spring

References 

Salt Lake City
Springs of Utah
Water wells in the United States